The Deanery Church of England High School and Sixth Form College is a coeducational secondary school and sixth form located in Wigan, Greater Manchester, England. It is a Church of England voluntary aided school.

The school's campus is located near the town centre, very close to Wigan bus station and the main Royal Mail sorting office.

History
The school opened in 1971 as a successor to All Saints School, which was founded in 1931. It was previously housed mainly in former All Saints buildings; however, starting in summer 2015 most of these old buildings were demolished in order to make way for a new £15 million build, funded under the Government's Priority Schools' Building Programme (PSBP). The classrooms, offices and other facilities once housed in the now demolished buildings were relocated into temporary buildings at the rear of the school near its all-weather pitch, with the first new buildings to be occupied in September 2017, after which the rest of the old buildings were to be demolished. The school's sports hall was also renovated, with the classrooms in that building, formerly used for English, now housing a new music department, featuring two larger classrooms, a recording studio, an office for the heads of the performing arts and PE departments and a staff work room for the two departments.

Academics
The Deanery High School has a 6th Form College, offering A-Levels as well as Level 2 and 3 BTEC courses. Until 2017, the school offered Latin at GCSE level; it had previously also been an A-Level subject.

The 2016 OFSTED report said the school is "good".

Headteachers
John Sharples, 1971–1987
Richard Williams, 1987–1997
Roger Mallows, 1997–2007
John Whiteley (acting), 2005–2006
Janice Rowlands (acting), 2008
Stephen Brierley, 2008–2013
Janice Rowlands, 2013–2019
Martin Wood, 2019–Current

Former students
 Jenny Meadows, Olympic athlete.
 Chris Hill, Warrington Wolves and England rugby league player
 Jon Pollock, wheelchair basketballer, medallist at the Summer Paralympic Games

References

Secondary schools in the Metropolitan Borough of Wigan
Church of England secondary schools in the Diocese of Liverpool
Voluntary aided schools in England
Educational institutions established in 1971
1971 establishments in England